The recording of Verdi's Ernani in 1903 by the Italian Gramophone Company, a part of HMV, was the first complete opera recording. It was issued on 40 single-sided discs. The first complete orchestral recording, Arthur Nikisch's recording of Beethoven's Fifth Symphony, was made in 1913.

References
Notes

Sources
Dearling, Robert and Celia; and Brian A. L. Rust, Guinness Book of Music, Sterling Publishing, 1981, 2nd edition, 1982.   

1900s classical albums
Opera recordings
Giuseppe Verdi
1903 albums
HMV albums